Giant Finn may refer to:

Fionn mac Cumhaill
Fin (troll)